Darzi Mahalleh (also Romanized as Darzī Maḩalleh; also known as Dowzī Maḩalleh) is a village in Khoshk Rud Rural District, Rudbast District, Babolsar County, Mazandaran Province, Iran. At the 2006 census, its population was 137, in 35 families.

References 

Populated places in Babolsar County